In theoretical physics Pohlmeyer charge, named for Klaus Pohlmeyer, is a conserved charge invariant under the Virasoro algebra or its generalization. It can be obtained by expanding the holonomies (generating functions)

According to the logic of loop quantum gravity and algebraic quantum field theory, these charges are the right physical quantities that should be used for quantization. This logic is however incompatible with the standard and well-established methods of quantum field theory based on Fock space and perturbation theory.

Theoretical physics
Quantum field theory
Conformal field theory